Carsten Birk (born 1 October 1977) is a German former professional footballer who played as a defender.

References

Living people
1977 births
People from Völklingen
German footballers
Footballers from Saarland
Association football defenders
2. Bundesliga players
Regionalliga players
1. FC Saarbrücken players
Karlsruher SC players
SpVgg Greuther Fürth players
SV Elversberg players